Caitlin Shetterly is a Maine-based writer and theatre director. Her books include PETE AND ALICE in Maine, (2023, Harper Collins) Modified; Made for You and Me: Going West, Going Broke, Finding Home and the bestselling Fault Lines: Stories of Divorce. In 2003, Shetterly founded the Winter Harbor Theatre Company. She was Artistic Director until 2011, when the company folded.

Early life

Shetterly graduated from Brown University with Honors in English and American Literature.  Her first book, Fault Lines: Stories of Divorce, a collection of short stories she edited, was published in 2001 (Putnam Berkley Group).

Career
In the spring of 2008, Shetterly started the blog Passage West chronicling her tumultuous move with her husband from Maine to Los Angeles, CA. In response to the 2008 recession, which Shetterly was blogging about, she was asked to create a series of audio diaries entitled The Recession Diaries for National Public Radio. The Recession Diaries, which told her personal story of struggle with the Recession, made Shetterly an overnight sensation. Both the audio diaries and her blog inspired her second book, a memoir, Made For You and Me: Going West, Going Broke, Finding Home (Voice, 2011).

After being diagnosed with a sensitivity to genetically modified corn, Shetterly wrote a 2013 piece in Elle called "The Bad Seed: The Health Risks of Genetically Modified Corn", and her third book, Modified (Putnam, a Division of Penguin Random House) was created out of that work. 

Shetterly has been a frequent contributor to National Public Radio and has written for The New York Times & The New York Times Magazine, Elle, Self, and on Oprah.com, SheWrites.com, and Medium.com. She has been a contributor to This American Life, Studio 360, WNYC, WAMC, Maine Public Radio, among other public radio outlets.

In 2003, Shetterly founded the Winter Harbor Theatre Company in Portland, Maine. With the company Shetterly created the "Letters Series...", a run of shows about social issues such as the war in Iraq, the Katrina disaster and gun control. The shows were formed from entirely original pieces which Shetterly commissioned from playwrights and artists across America. Each show brought the selected performers and playwrights together for one week in Maine where they rehearsed and performed.

From 2003 to 2007, Shetterly wrote a bimonthly dating column called Bramhall Square for the Portland Phoenix newspaper in Portland, ME.

Personal life

Shetterly lives with her husband, photographer Daniel E. Davis, and their sons in Portland, Maine.

Her parents, the painter Robert Shetterly and author Susan Hand Shetterly, both live in Maine. Her brother Aran Shetterly and sister-in-law Margot Lee Shetterly are also authors.

References

External links

1974 births
Living people
Writers from Portland, Maine
Brown University alumni
21st-century American writers